Skeete is a surname of English origin. People with the name include:

 Bradley Skeete (born 1987), British boxer
 Clarence Skeete (1916–2001), Trinidadian cricketer
 Jarvin Skeete (born 1981), Saint Lucian footballer
 Lesley-Ann Skeete (born 1967), British hurdler
 Margaret Skeete (1878–1994), American centenarian
 Oliver Skeete (born 1956), British showjumper
 Sam Skeete (born 1981), Barbadian cricketer

English-language surnames